The Milwaukee Breakwater lighthouse was built in 1926 in the harbor of Milwaukee in Milwaukee County, Wisconsin to mark the entrance to the harbor. One of the last fully enclosed breakwater lighthouses in the Great Lakes, the structure was placed on the National Register of Historic Places in 2011.

History
This lighthouse, owned and operated by the United States Coast Guard, is an active aid to navigation. The steel tower has a square Balcony and "round cast iron lantern room [that] features helical astragals" in the lantern. The two-story steel lighthouse keeper's quarters are in the art deco style. The red light has a focal plane of  feet above Lake Michigan. The lantern and parapet are painted black.

The structure is near the middle of the four-mile-long Milwaukee breakwater. It is built to withstand heavy weather and waves when Lake Michigan becomes roughest.  The building is made of  "steel plates over a steel skeletal frame, and is equipped with windows and portholes with glass a full half inch in thickness."  The structure was originally painted red, but became white thereafter.

In 1926, the original fourth order Fresnel lens was transferred from the Milwaukee Pierhead Light.  The "helical barred lantern is also thought to have come from the pierhead light".  The lens was removed in 1994, and is now an exhibit in Manitowoc at the Wisconsin Maritime Museum.

The resident lighthouse keepers serviced not only this light, but all of the lights in the harbor, however boat launching and landing from this structure was especially risky.  A list of keepers is available.

In June 2011 the United States Coast Guard declared that they no longer need the lighthouse, and that they will transfer it to eligible organizations, or if none are found, auction it. In 2013, Optima Enrichment acquired the lighthouse from the Coast Guard and is currently raising funds in order to open the lighthouse to the public.

Access
The lighthouse is situated on the north side of the harbor at the end of the breakwater.  Because the shore and breakwater are disconnected, it is necessary to use a boat to reach it.  The best view is from the parking lot at the end of East Erie Street, adjacent to the Milwaukee Pierhead Light.  Those who are interested in photographing it will need a telephoto or zoom lens.  The tower and site are closed.

References

Further reading

 Eckert, Jack A. A Small Slice of Life—Milwaukee Breakwater Light Station. Lighthouse Digest (October, 2003).
 Havighurst, Walter (1943) The Long Ships Passing: The Story of the Great Lakes, Macmillan Publishers.
 Oleszewski, Wes, Great Lakes Lighthouses, American and Canadian: A Comprehensive Directory/Guide to Great Lakes Lighthouses, (Gwinn, Michigan: Avery Color Studios, Inc., 1998) .
 
 Sapulski, Wayne S., (2001) Lighthouses of Lake Michigan: Past and Present (Paperback) (Fowlerville: Wilderness Adventure Books) ; .
 Wright, Larry and Wright, Patricia, Great Lakes Lighthouses Encyclopedia Hardback (Erin: Boston Mills Press, 2006) .

External links
Friends of the Milwaukee Breakwater Lighthouse
Satellite view of Milwaukee Breakwater Light, Google earth.
Wobser, David, Milwaukee Breakwater Light, Boatnerd.com

Lighthouses completed in 1926
Houses completed in 1926
Lighthouses in Wisconsin
Buildings and structures in Milwaukee
Tourist attractions in Milwaukee
National Register of Historic Places in Milwaukee
1926 establishments in Wisconsin